MACR or MACRS may refer to

Master Aircrew (MAcr), a rank of the Royal Air force
Minimum Age of Criminal Responsibility, MACR
Modified Accelerated Cost Recovery System (MACRS) of the U.S. tax code